Lībagi Parish is an administrative unit of Talsi Municipality, Latvia.

Towns, villages and settlements of Lībagi parish 
  — parish administrative center

References 

Parishes of Latvia
Talsi Municipality